Personal Mountains is a live album by American pianist Keith Jarrett's 'European Quartet' recorded in 1979 and released by ECM Records 10 years later, in 1989.  The recording documents the band featuring Jarrett, Jan Garbarek, Palle Danielsson and Jon Christensen), in different live performances in Tokyo in April 1979.

April 1979 Tour in Japan 
Personal Mountains contains tracks from different concerts performed in Tokyo in April 1979. According to www.keithjarrett.org, that April Jarrett's "European Quartet" toured Japan performing 13 times in 20 days which also gave way to  Sleeper.

 2 - Kosei Nenkin Hall, Tokyo
 4 - Civic Hall, Fukuoka
 5 - Yubin-Chokin Hall, Hiroshima
 6 - Kosei Nenkin Hall, Osaka
 9 - International House, Kobe
 10 - Kaikan Hall 1, Kyoto
 12 - Aichi Auditorium, Nagoya
 13 - Kosei Nenkin Hall, Tokyo
 16 - Nakano Sun Plaza, Tokyo – Sleeper (1989)
 17 - Nakano Sun Plaza, Tokyo
 18 - Hokkaido Kosei Nenkin Hall, Sapporo
 20 - Kanagawa Kenmin Hall, Yokohama
 21 - Prefectural Culture Center, Ibaraki

Reception
The Allmusic review by Richard S. Ginell awarded the album 4 stars, stating, "Clearly this is one of the peaks of the European quartet's discography.".

Track listing
All compositions by Keith Jarrett.

 "Personal Mountains" - 16:02
 "Prism" - 11:15
 "Oasis" - 18:03 
 "Innocence" - 7:16
 "Late Night Willie" - 8:46

Personnel 
 Keith Jarrett - piano, percussion
 Jan Garbarek - tenor and soprano saxophones
 Palle Danielsson - double-bass
 Jon Christensen - drums

Production
 Manfred Eicher - producer
 Jan Erik Kongshaug - recording engineer
 Rose Anne Colavito - drawing
 Barbara Wojirsch - layout

References 

Jan Garbarek live albums
Keith Jarrett live albums
1989 live albums
ECM Records live albums
Albums produced by Manfred Eicher